Hindu Rashtra Sena is an Indian Hindu organization. Its stated objective is propagating for the establishment of Hindu Rashtra. Dhananjay Desai is chief Hindu Rashtra Sena (HRS).

Incident 

After the name of Hindu Rashtra Sena in the murder of a 28-year-old IT professional from Pune city, its chief Dhananjay Desai and others were arrested. He was released on bail in 2019 after a court hearing. All accused were ultimately acquitted by court in 2023. Desai accused that government falsely arrested him because of political vendetta against him.

References

Hindutva
Sangh Parivar
Hinduism and politics
Far-right politics in India
Vishva Hindu Parishad
Anti-Muslim violence in India
Anti-Islam sentiment in India